Reading Football Club Women is an English women's football club affiliated with Reading FC. The Club plays in the Women's Super League, the top flight of English women's football. Reading F.C. Women previously played in the FA Women's Premier League National Division after being promoted from the FA Women's Premier League Southern Division, which they were relegated to at the end of the 2011–12 season. They had previously won promotion to the National Division from the Southern Division in 2009–10. They gained entry to an expanded FA WSL in 2014.

History

Reading FC began an association with women's football when it affiliated with Reading Royals LFC (previously Twyford Comets) in 1988.

In May 2006, Reading ended this affiliation and started their own women's team, Reading FC Women. In their first season they achieved a Southern Region Women's Football League and Cup double and were promoted to the South West Combination Women's Football League. They followed this with an unbeaten 2007–08 League season to gain promotion to the Premier League Northern Division (in which they competed due to an overload at the Southern).

After finishing sixth in the Northern Division, Reading were transferred to the Southern Division for the 2009–10 season. In 2010 they won their last four games of the season to finish runners–up to Barnet and secure promotion to the FA Women's Premier League National Division.

On 3 April 2011 Reading successfully defended the Berks and Bucks County Cup trophy, cruising past Milton Keynes Dons 3–0 in the final.

Their first season in the FA Women's Premier League National Division (the second highest league, following the formation of the Women's Super League) saw Reading finish third. In March 2012 Reading lost top goalscorer Nikki Watts to WSL club Bristol Academy. They finished 9th in the National Division in the 2011–12 season, resulting in their relegation back to the Southern Division for 2012–13.

In 2012–13 Reading FC Women won the FA Premier League Southern Division by eight points and a goal difference of 41, while both the first and reserve team retained the County Cup.

Reading's top scorer in 2012–13, Fran Kirby, was rewarded for her campaign by being named as Player of the Season – as well as receiving a call up to play for Great Britain in the World University Games in Kazan, Russia. Striker Kirby surpassed the 30-goal mark this season and was also selected for an England under-23s Camp.

Reading were granted a licence to play in the FA Women's Super League 2 from 2014. They won the division in the 2015 season and were promoted to the FA WSL. On 10 December 2015 it was announced that Reading would play their home games at Adams Park, the home of Wycombe Wanderers FC, for the next two seasons.

Reading finished the 2017–18 season in 4th place and 5th in both 2018–19 and 2019–20, reaching the Semi-Final of the FA Women's Cup in 2018-19. The side finished 7th in the 2020–21 season, continuing the steady decline to 8th in 2021–22.

Management

Reading F.C. Women Director of Women's and Girls' Football and First Team Manager is former captain of Reading F.C. Women, Kelly Chambers. Chambers took over from former manager Jayne Ludlow who stepped down to manage Wales. She is assisted by Head Coach Phil Cousins.

Players

Current squad

Out on loan

Former players
For details of current and former players, see :Category:Reading F.C. Women players.

Stadium
Reading FC Women currently play at the Madejski Stadium (rebranded as the Select Car Leasing Stadium from 2021), having moved to it before the 2020–21 FA WSL season. Before then, they played at Rushmoor Community Stadium in Farnborough, Hampshire before moving to Adams Park in High Wycombe, Buckinghamshire. The club moved there after they gained promotion to the FA WSL in 2015.

Honours 

 South West Combination Women's Football League:
 Winners (1): 2007/08
 FA Women's Premier League Southern Division:
 Winners (1): 2012/13
 FA WSL 2:
 Winners (1): 2015

References

External links

 

 
Women's football clubs in England
Women
Association football clubs established in 2006
Sport in Reading, Berkshire
Football clubs in Reading
2006 establishments in England
FA WSL 1 teams
Women's Championship (England) teams
FA Women's National League teams